Karatal (Qaratal) is a rural locality (a village) in Imay-Karmalinsky Selsoviet, Davlekanovsky District, Bashkortostan, Russia. The population was 87 as of 2010. There are 2 streets.

Geography 
Karatal is located 33 km east of Davlekanovo (the district's administrative centre) by road. Batraki is the nearest rural locality.

References 

Rural localities in Davlekanovsky District